Glensboro is an unincorporated community in Anderson County, Kentucky, United States.  It lies along Route 44 west of the city of Lawrenceburg, the county seat of Anderson County.  Its elevation is 610 feet (186 m).

The community is part of the Frankfort Micropolitan Statistical Area.

References

External links
History of Glensboro

Unincorporated communities in Anderson County, Kentucky
Unincorporated communities in Kentucky
Frankfort, Kentucky micropolitan area